Candyce Edwards (born 29 November 1986 in Hamilton, New Zealand) is a New Zealand netball player. Edwards played for the Western Flyers (2007) in the National Bank Cup and the Central Pulse (2008) in the ANZ Championship. After the Pulse failed to secure a win in their inaugural season, much of their player roster was changed and Edwards was not recalled for the 2009 season.

References

New Zealand netball players
Central Pulse players
1986 births
ANZ Championship players
Living people
Western Flyers players